Boghos Nubar, also known as Boghos Nubar Pasha (2 August 1851 – 25 June 1930), was a chairman of the Armenian National Delegation, and the founder, alongside ten other Armenian national movement leaders, of the Armenian General Benevolent Union (AGBU) on April 15, 1906, becoming its first ever president, a position he held from 1906 to 1928.

In 1912, he was appointed by Catholicos Gevorg V to head the Armenian National Delegation.

Early life 
Nubar was born in Istanbul (capital of the Ottoman Empire) in 1851. His father was Egyptian Prime Minister Nubar Pasha.

Career 
Nubar fought for the Armenian cause.

As early as the beginning of 1912 the Catholicos of Mother See of Echmiazin Gevork V had sent the Boghos Nubar to the Cabinets of Europe with a commission to demand administrative autonomy for Armenians in the Ottoman Empire. He has also been considered as one of the prominent Armenian figures in the Ottoman Empire. This proceeding was a step for Russian and French policy in Constantinople almost at the same moment on March 15, 1913. Boghos Nubar, the ambassador, repeatedly asserts that the Armenians of Ottoman Empire in no way desire to bring up the question of independence or constitutional changes (regarding Armenian National Constitution). Their sole aim is to secure the reforms drawn up by Russia France and England and provided for in the Treaty of Berlin reforms which have remained a dead letter hitherto. In February 1914, the Armenian reform package passed.

In January, 1919, The Times published a letter from Boghos Nubar (an Ottoman citizen) in which he protests, belatedly, about the non-representation of Armenians at the Paris Peace Conference, 1919. The letter includes a useful summary of the Armenian contribution to the allied war effort.

Boghos Nubar died in Paris in 1930.

Awards 
Boghos Nubar was awarded the Belgian "Ordre de Leopold" and Egyptian Medjidieh, Osmanieh and Nile Orders, honorary degrees and medals for distinguished services

References

1851 births
1930 deaths
Egyptian people of Armenian descent
Presidents of the Armenian General Benevolent Union
Recipients of the Order of the Medjidie
People from Istanbul
Armenians from the Ottoman Empire